Mrudula Murali Mangalasseri, credited as Mrudula Murali, is an Indian actress, model, anchor and classical dancer.

Personal life

Mrudula was born to Muralidharan Nair, who is working as an engineer in F.A.C.T Kalamassery, and Latha Menon in Ernakulam, Kerala. She completed her secondary education at Assisi Vidyaniketan Public School, Ernakulam. She has a bachelor's degree from St. Teresa's College, Ernakulam and PG degree in Media studies at M.O.P. Vaishnav College for Women, Chennai. Her only brother Mithun Murali is also an actor-cum-model.
Mridula Murali married Nitin Malini Vijay, who's an aspiring filmmaker; currently working on the advertisement front, on 29 October 2020.

Career

Mrudula started as a child anchor in the program Dial & See telecast in Jeevan TV along with her brother Midhun Murali as co-anchor. She has acted numerous ad-films in Tamil and Malayalam and also shot for a Tamil film, the Ilaiyaraaja musical Kangalum Kavipaduthey in 2007, which did not get a theatrical release. She stepped into the film industry with the Malayalam film Red Chillies. She received critical acclaim for her role as Shenbagavalli in her debut Tamil film Nagaraja Cholan MA, MLA.

She had no theatrical releases in 2014 but appeared in a short film titled Maniyara. Her Tamil film Chikkiku Chikkikkichu is a romantic comedy that unfolds during a train journey. She has been signed as one of the female leads in the Malayalam films Enthoru Bhagyam, which will feature her as Heera Samson, a modern girl from Bangalore, who is "bubbly and lively".

Mrudula Murali got her major breakthrough with the Bollywood movie Raagdesh, where she played Captain Lakshmi Sehgal. The movie and her role received praise from various corners. Her acting and dialogue received special mention in reviews. She at present is acting in the Tamil movie Pistha, starring Shirish Sharavanan of Metro fame and also in Ulagam Vilakku Varudhu, directed by Thambi Ramaiah, starring his son Umapathy.

Filmography

Television

 Dial & See (Jeevan TV)
 The Happiness Project   (Kappa TV) as Associate producer
 Katturumbu (Flowers TV)
 Ambalappuzha Palppayasam (Mazhavil Manorama)
 Dhe Chef (Mazhavil Manorama)
 Sadhya Rice - advertisement
 Thangamayil Jewellery Limited - advertisement

References

External links

Living people
Indian film actresses
Actresses from Kochi
Actresses in Malayalam cinema
Actresses in Tamil cinema
21st-century Indian actresses
Year of birth missing (living people)
Actresses in Hindi cinema
St. Teresa's College alumni